Tonlesapia is a genus of freshwater dragonets native to Southeast Asia.

Species
There are currently two recognized species in this genus:
 Tonlesapia amnica H. H. Ng & Rainboth, 2011 (Mekong delta dragonet)
 Tonlesapia tsukawakii Motomura & Mukai, 2006

References

Callionymidae
Fish of Asia
Marine fish genera